Adelina Maria Boguș ( Cojocariu; born 4 September 1988) is a Romanian rower. She competed in the women's eight event at the 2012 and 2016 Summer Olympics, winning a bronze medal.

She won gold in the women's eight at the 2009, 2010, 2014 and 2017 European Championships, silver at the 2009 World Championships and bronze at the 2010 World Championships and 2015 European Championships.  In the women's double sculls, she won the bronze medal at the 2012 European Championships with Maria Diana Bursuc  In the women's quadruple sculls, she won bronze at the 2008 European Championships with Ionelia Zaharia, Cristina Ilie and Roxana Cogianu.  In the women's pair, she won a bronze at the 2007 European Championships with Nicoleta Albu.

References

External links
 
 
 
 
 

1988 births
Living people
Romanian female rowers
Sportspeople from Botoșani
Rowers at the 2012 Summer Olympics
Rowers at the 2016 Summer Olympics
Olympic rowers of Romania
World Rowing Championships medalists for Romania
Olympic bronze medalists for Romania
Medalists at the 2016 Summer Olympics
Olympic medalists in rowing